The Canon EOS-1D X Mark III is the company's 20-megapixel full-frame DSLR flagship camera, announced on January 6, 2020, by Canon. It is the successor to the Canon EOS-1D X Mark II, which was released on February 1, 2016.

The camera will reportedly be Canon's final flagship DSLR, as the company shifts entirely to mirrorless cameras.

Features 
New features over the Canon EOS-1D X Mark II are:

 5.5k (5472 × 2886) with up to 60 fps (59.94 fps)
 Continuous shooting rate of up to 16 frames per second with full autofocus; 20 fps in live view.
 191 AF points support
 Dual CFexpress card slots (as opposed to one Compact Flash and one CFast slot in EOS-1D X Mark II)
 ISO range up to 102400 (Extended H3 up to 819200)
 Support for HDR PQ still photo shooting in High Efficiency Image File Format (HEIF) compliant with Rec. 2100 color space (PQ transfer function, Rec. 2020 color primaries, 10 bit depth, 4:2:2 YCbCr subsampling)

References

External links 
 
 Official web page
 Sample Images & Movies

1D X Mk III
Cameras introduced in 2020
Full-frame DSLR cameras